Qoşabulaq (also, Koshabulak) is a village and municipality in the Gadabay Rayon of Azerbaijan.  It has a population of 2,224.  The municipality consists of the villages of Qoşabulaq, Totuqlu, and Tərs yer.

References 

Populated places in Gadabay District